Snowfall on the Sahara is a studio album by American singer  Natalie Cole. It was released by Elektra Records on June 22, 1999 in the United States.

Critical reception

AllMusic editor Stephen Thomas Erlewine found that "with Snowfall on the Sahara, [Cole] pulls back from her classic pop routine and she does so with style [...] Even with such clean radio-ready production, Snowfall on the Sahara is hardly a conventional adult contemporary record; it plays like a nightclub revue from a classic pop vocalist, only with modernized arrangements and songs. Such subtle deviations from formula results in a surprisingly satisfying record. By balancing the form of traditional pop with strong material and modernized production, Snowfall on the Sahara illustrates adult pop needs to be neither predictable or devoid of substantive songs."

Track listing
Credits taken from the album's liner notes.

Personnel
Information is based on AllMusic and the album's liner notes.

Vocalists 

Natalie Cole – lead vocals, backing vocals
Robin Clark – backing vocals
Diva Gray – backing vocals
Curtis King – backing vocals
Rob Mathes – additional vocals, backing vocals
Phil Ramone – backing vocals
Fonzi Thornton – backing vocals
Darryl Tookes – backing vocals
Luther Vandross – backing vocals

String section
Violins: Murray Adler, Abe Appleman, Avril Brown, Barry Finclair, Tiffany Yi Hu, Regis Iandiorio, Joe Ketendjian, Gary Kuo, Ann Leathers, Isabella Lippi, Jan Mullen, Sara Parkins, Paul Peabody, Rafael Rishik, Bob Sanov, Marti Sweet, Kimiyo Takeya, Donna Tecco and Jennifer Walton
Cellos: Stephen Erdody, Jeanne LeBlanc, Richard Locker, Mark Orrin Shuman and Cecilia Tsan
Violas: Mary Helen Ewing, Crystal Garner, Rick Gerding, Mimi Granat, Juliet Haffner, Carol Landon, Andrew Picken and Sue Pray   
Concertmasters: Endre Granat and Carol Webb

Other Instruments

Dave Bargeron – tenor trombone, bass trombone 
Virgil Blackwell – clarinet
Bob Carlisie – French horn
Clifford Carter – Hammond organ
Pete Christlieb – clarinet, tenor saxophone
Ronnie Cuber – baritone saxophone
Jacqui Danilow – bass 
Charlie Davis – trumpet
Rick DePofi – tenor saxophone
Louise de Tullio – flute 
Nathan East – bass 
Lawrence Feldman – alto saxophone
David Finck – bass
David Foster – keyboards 
Simon Franglen – Synclavier
Steve Gadd – drums 
Terry Harrington – clarinet, tenor saxophone
Dave Hughart – bass played by
Harold Jones – drums
Jeff Kievit – trumpet
Chris Komer – French horn
Abe Laboriel Jr. – drum loop
Will Lee – bass 
Diane Lesser – oboe
Warren Leuning – trumpet
Gayle Levant – harp
Tony Levin – bass 
Charles Loper – trombone
Rob Mathes – Wurlitzer, keyboards, dobro, electric guitar
Bob McChesney – trombone
Edward Meares – bass
Jeff Mironov – electric guitar, slide guitar, additional guitars
Lanny Morgan – flute, alto flute, alto saxophone
John Moses – clarinet
Rob Mounsey – Theremin, keyboards, electric piano 
Jack Nimitz – baritone saxophone, bass clarinet 
Jim Pugh – tenor trombone
Carl Saunders – trumpet
Pamela Sklar – flute
Phillip Teele – trombone
Michael Thompson – guitar 
David Tofani – tenor saxophone
Dave Trigg – trumpet
Terry Trotter – piano
Peter Wolf – musician

Charts

References

1999 albums
Natalie Cole albums
albums produced by David Foster
albums produced by Phil Ramone
Elektra Records albums